Status–income disequilibrium (sometimes abbreviated SID) occurs when a desirable high status job has a relatively low income. It is a variation on the sociological term status inconsistency.  The phrase was coined by The New York Times columnist David Brooks in his 1996 article "The Tragedy of SID".  He wrote:

David Brooks characterized the "sufferers" from SID in a long list, which includes TV news producers, museum curators,  classical music performers, White House aides, and politicians, among others.  Other journalists applied the term to "authors and academics", journalists, writers,  "British middle classes", and even to the British MPs.

See also 

 The rich get richer and the poor get poorer

Notes

References 
David Brooks, "The Tragedy of SID", The Weekly Standard, May 6, 1996.

Income distribution
Sociological terminology
Political terminology of the United States
Social inequality